"Saw Something" and "Deeper and Deeper" are songs performed by Depeche Mode's singer Dave Gahan, co-written and co-produced by Gahan, Andrew Phillpott, and Christian Eigner for Gahan's second solo album Hourglass (2007). The songs were released as a double A-side single on January 14, 2008. "Saw Something" features the Red Hot Chili Peppers's member John Frusciante's guitar playing. The song was used in the trailer of the 2009 film Obsessed and the upcoming film Claustrum.

Track listings
The European CD and LCD differ only in packaging, the CD being a jewel case and the LCD being card case.

European CD single
(CD MUTE 398/LCD MUTE 398; Released January 14, 2008)
 "Saw Something" (Single version) 
 "Deeper and Deeper" (Shrubbn!! single version)
 "Love Will Leave" (Das Shadow's rework)
 "Deeper and Deeper" (Juan MacLean club mix)

European 7-inch picture disc
(MUTE 398; Released January 14, 2008)
 "Saw Something" (Single version) 
 "Deeper and Deeper" (Shrubbn!! single version)

European 12-inch single
(12 MUTE 398; Released January 14, 2008)
 "Saw Something" (Single version) 
 "Deeper and Deeper" (Juan MacLean dub)
 "Deeper and Deeper" (Shrubbn!! single version)
 "Love Will Leave" (Kap10kurt remix)
 
Digital download
(Released December 10, 2007)
 "Saw Something" (Single version) 
 "Deeper and Deeper" (Shrubbn!! single version)

Charts

References

2007 songs
2008 singles
Dave Gahan songs
Mute Records singles
Songs written by Dave Gahan
Songs written by Christian Eigner